The discography of TNT, a Norwegian-based hard rock band formed in 1982, consists of thirteen studio albums, twelve singles, four live albums, three EPs, three compilation albums, and a DVD. This list does not include solo material or sideprojects performed by the members.

Studio albums

Live albums

Compilation albums

Extended plays

Singles

Video albums

Music videos

References

Discographies of Norwegian artists
Heavy metal group discographies